New York City English, or Metropolitan New York English, is a regional dialect of American English spoken by many people in New York City and much of its surrounding metropolitan area. It is described by sociolinguist William Labov as the most recognizable regional dialect in North America. Its pronunciation system—the New York accent—is widely represented in American media with many public figures and fictional characters. Major features of the accent include a high, gliding  vowel (in words like talk and caught); a split of the "short a" vowel  into two separate sounds; variable dropping of r sounds; and a lack of the cot–caught, Mary–marry–merry, and hurry–furry mergers heard in many other American accents.

Today, New York City English is associated particularly with urban New Yorkers of lower or mid socioeconomic status, descended from 19th- and 20th-century European immigrants. It is spoken in all five boroughs of the City and Long Island's Nassau County, as well as in varying degrees among speakers in Suffolk County (Long Island), Westchester County, and Rockland County of New York State, plus Hudson and Bergen Counties in northeastern New Jersey.

History
The origins of many of New York City English's diverse features are probably not recoverable. New York City English, largely with the same major pronunciation system popularly recognized today, was first reproduced in literature and scientifically documented in the 1890s. It was then, and still mostly is, associated with ethnically diverse European-American native-English speakers. The entire Mid-Atlantic United States, including both New York City and the Delaware Valley (whose own distinct dialect centers around Philadelphia and Baltimore) shares certain key features, including a high  vowel with a glide (sometimes called the aww vowel) as well as a phonemic split of the short a vowel,  (making gas and gap, for example, have different vowels sounds)—New York City's split not identical though to Philadelphia's. Linguist William Labov has pointed out that a similarly structured (though differently pronounced) split is found today even in the southern accents of England; thus, a single common origin of this split may trace back to colonial-era England.

New York City became an urban economic power in the eighteenth century, with the city's financial elites maintaining close ties with the British Empire even after the Revolutionary War. According to Labov, New York City speakers' loss of the r sound after vowels (incidentally, not found in the nearby Delaware Valley) began as a nineteenth-century imitation of the prestigious British feature, consistently starting among the upper classes in New York City before spreading to other socioeconomic classes. After World War II, social perceptions reversed and r-preserving (rhotic) pronunciations became the new American prestige standard, rejecting East Coast and British accent features, while postwar migrations transferred rhotic speakers directly to New York City from other regions of the country. The result is that non-rhoticity, which was once a high-status feature and later a city-wide feature, has been diminishing and now, since the mid-twentieth century onward, largely remains only among lower-status New Yorkers. Today, New York City metropolitan accents are often rhotic or variably rhotic.

Other features of the dialect, such as the dental pronunciations of d and t, and related th-stopping, likely come from contact with foreign languages, particularly Italian and Yiddish, brought into New York City through its huge immigration waves of Europeans during the mid-to-late nineteenth century. Grammatical structures, such as the lack of inversion in indirect questions, similarly suggest contact with immigrant languages, plus several words common in the city are derived from such foreign languages.

Influence on other dialects
Philadelphians born in the twentieth century exhibit a short-a split system that some linguists regard as a simplification of the very similar New York City short-a split. Younger Philadelphians, however, are retreating from many of the traditional features shared in common with New York City. Due to an influx of immigrants from New York City and neighboring New Jersey to southern Florida, some resident southern Floridians now speak with an accent reminiscent of a New York accent. Similarly, dialect similarities suggest that older New York City English also influenced Cincinnati, Ohio and Albany, New York, whose older speakers in particular may still exhibit a short-a split system that linguists suggest is an expanded or generalized variant of the New York City short-a system. Certain New York City dialect features also understandably appear in New York City Latino English.

Recent developments
Though William Labov argued in 2010 that the New York City accent is basically stable at the moment, some recent studies have revealed a trend of recession in most features of the accent, especially among younger speakers from middle-class or higher backgrounds. Documented loss of New York City accent features includes the loss of the coil–curl merger (now almost completely extinct), non-rhoticity, and the extremely raised long vowel  (as in talk, cough, or law). Researchers proposed that the motivation behind these recessive trends is the stigmatization against the typical New York City accent since the mid-1900s as being associated with a poorer or working-class background, often also corresponding with particular ethnic identities. While earlier projects detected trends of emphasizing New York City accents as part of a process of social identification, recent researches attribute the loss of typical accent features to in-group ethnic distancing. In other words, many of the young generations of ethnic groups who formerly were the most representative speakers of the accent are currently avoiding its features in order to not stand out socially or ethnically.

Pronunciation

The pronunciation of New York City English, most popularly acknowledged by the term New York accent, is readily noticed and stereotyped, garnering considerable attention in American culture. Some distinctive phonological features include its traditional dropping of r except before vowels, a short-a split system (in which, for example, the a in gas is not assonant to the a in gap), a high gliding  vowel (in words like talk, thought, all, etc. and thus an absence of the cot–caught merger), absence of the Mary–marry–merry merger, and the highly stigmatized (and largely now-extinct) coil–curl merger.

Vocabulary and grammar
There are some words or grammatical constructions used mainly in Greater New York City:
 : a small neighborhood convenience store; used in recent decades, particularly in New York City though not on Long Island generally, it comes from Spanish, originally meaning "a wine storehouse" via the Puerto Rican Spanish term for "small store; corner store"; by extension, "bodega cats" is the term for the cats that inhabit such establishments. These small stores may also be called , which is the short form of delicatessens.
bubkes : a worthless amount; little or nothing (from Yiddish; probably an abbreviation of kozebubkes, literally, "goat droppings")
dungarees: an older term for blue jeans
egg cream: a mixture of cold milk, chocolate syrup, and seltzer (carbonated water)
have a catch: to play a game of catch
hero: a footlong sandwich or "sub"
Mischief Night: the night before Halloween
on line: Metro New Yorkers tend to say they stand  line, whereas most other New York State and American English speakers tend to stand in line. 
: the small front staircase or steps up to a building (from the Dutch word "")
punchball and stickball: street variants of baseball, suitable for smaller urban areas, in which a fist or stick substitutes for the bat and a rubber ball (a "Spaldeen") is used
skel(l): a vagrant, beggar, or small-time street criminal
s(c)hmuck: an insulting term for an unlikeable man (from Yiddish shmok: "penis")
yous(e) (often ): the plural form of you, in addition to you guys or, possibly performatively, yous guys

The word  tends to be used as a synonym for "weak", "someone unwilling or unable to defend himself" or perhaps "loser", though it appears to descend from an outdated New York African-American English meaning of male receptive participant in anal sex.

Conversational styles
New York City speakers have some unique conversational styles. Linguistics professor Deborah Tannen notes in a New York Times article it has "an emphasis to involve the other person, rather than being considerate. It would be asking questions as a show of interest in the other person, whereas in other parts of [the] country, people don't ask because it might put the person on the spot." Metro New Yorkers "stand closer, talk louder, and leave shorter pauses between exchanges," Tannen said. "I call it 'cooperative overlap'. It's a way of showing interest and enthusiasm, but it's often mistaken for interrupting by people from elsewhere in the country." On the other hand, linguist William Labov demurs, "there's nothing known to linguists about 'normal New York City conversation'".

Notable speakers

The accent has a strong presence in media; pioneer variationist sociolinguist William Labov describes it as the most recognizable variety of North American English. The following famous people are native New York City area speakers, demonstrating typical features of the accent.

 Bella Abzug
 Eric Adams
 Danny Aiello
 Alan Alda
 Woody Allen
 Jack Armstrong (basketball)
 Mel Brooks
 James Caan
 James Cagney
 Mariah Carey
 George Carlin
 Andrew Dice Clay
 Michael Cohen
 Howard Cosell
 Mario Cuomo
 Tony Curtis
 Larry David
 Rodney Dangerfield
 Tony Danza
 Dead End Kids
 Billy Donovan
 Robert De Niro
 Alan Dershowitz
 Kevin Dobson
 Fran Drescher
 Jimmy Durante
 Anthony Fauci
 Mike Francesa
 John Garfield
 Ruth Bader Ginsburg
 Rudy Giuliani
 Whoopi Goldberg
 Gilbert Gottfried
 Buddy Hackett
 Judd Hirsch
 Meir Kahane
 Wendy Kaufman
 Harvey Keitel
 Ed Koch
 Burt Lancaster
 Cyndi Lauper
 John Leguizamo
 Vince Lombardi
 Bernard Madoff
 Barry Manilow
 Garry Marshall
 Penny Marshall
 The Marx Brothers; prominently Groucho Marx
 Jackie Mason
 Walter Matthau
 Debi Mazar
 John Mearsheimer
 Al Michaels
 Chris Mullin
 Al Pacino
 Joe Paterno
 Rosie Perez
 Rhea Perlman
 Regis Philbin
 Colin Quinn
 George Raft
 Charles Rangel
 Michael Rapaport
 Paul Reiser
 Leah Remini
 Linda Richman
 Don Rickles
 Thelma Ritter
 Joan Rivers
 Ray Romano
 Maxie Rosenbloom
 Adam Sandler
 Michael Savage
 Bernie Sanders
 Vin Scully
 Phil Silvers
 Al Smith
Sebastian Stan
 Arnold Stang
 Barbara Stanwyck
 Howard Stern
 Barbra Streisand
 Marisa Tomei
 John Travolta
 Donald Trump
 Christopher Walken
 Eli Wallach
 Denzel Washington
 Barry Wellman
 Mae West
 Lenny Wilkens
 Janet Yellen

Fictional characters
Many fictional characters in popular films and television shows have used New York City English, whether or not the actors portraying them are native speakers of the dialect. Some examples are listed below.
 The Bowery Boys
 Archie and Edith Bunker
 Bugs Bunny
 The Honeymooners cast
 Terry Malloy
 Meowth from Pokémon
 Mob Wives cast
 Rhoda Morgenstern
 The Sopranos cast
 Jerry Seinfeld and George Costanza from Seinfeld
 The Three Stooges
 Marisa Tomei as Mona Lisa Vito in My Cousin Vinny, for which she won the Academy Award for Best Supporting Actress
 Travis Bickle

Geographic boundaries
This accent is not spoken in the rest of New York State beyond the immediate New York City metropolitan area. Specifically, the upper Hudson Valley mixes New York City and Western New England accent features, while Central and Western New York belongs to the same dialect region as Great Lakes cities such as Chicago and Detroit, known as the Inland North.

New York State
New York City English is confined to a geographically small but densely populated area, including all five boroughs of New York City, as well as many speakers on Long Island: generally in Nassau County and somewhat in Suffolk County. Moreover, the English of the Hudson Valley forms a continuum of speakers who gather more features of New York City English the closer they are to the city itself; some of the dialect's features may be heard as far north as the state capital of Albany.

Connecticut
A small portion of southwestern Connecticut speaks a similar dialect, primarily speakers in Fairfield County and as far as New Haven County.

New Jersey
The northeast quarter of New Jersey, prominently Bergen, Hudson,  Union, and Essex counties, including the cities Weehawken, Hoboken, Jersey City, Bayonne, and Newark, plus Middlesex and Monmouth Counties, are all within the New York City metropolitan area and thus also home to the major features of New York City English. With the exception of New York City's immediate neighbors like Jersey City and Newark, the New York City metropolitan dialect as spoken in New Jersey is rhotic (or fully r-pronouncing), so that, whereas a Brooklynite might pronounce "over there" something like "ovah theah/deah" , an Elizabeth native might say "over there/dare" . The Atlas of North American English by William Labov et al. shows that the New York City short-a pattern has diffused to many r-pronouncing communities in northern New Jersey like Rutherford (Labov's birthplace) and North Plainfield. However, in these communities, the function word constraint is lost and the open syllable constraint is variable.

Notable speakers
The following is a list of notable lifelong native speakers of the rhotic New York City English of northeastern New Jersey:

 Jon Bon Jovi
 Danny DeVito
 Joey Diaz
 James Gandolfini
 Ed Harris
 William Labov
 Ray Liotta
 Joe Pesci
 Dick Vitale
 Zakk Wylde

Frank Sinatra is an older example of a non-rhotic speaker from New Jersey.

See also
 American English regional vocabulary
 Mission brogue
 New Orleans English
 New York Latino English
 North American English regional phonology

Explanatory notes

Citations

General and cited references 

 
 Becker, Kara & Amy Wing Mei Wong. 2009. The short-a system of New York City English: An update. 'University of Pennsylvania Working Papers in Linguistics. Volume 15, Issue 2 Article 3. pp: 10–20. http://repository.upenn.edu/pwpl/vol15/iss2/3/
 Becker, Kara & Elizabeth Coggshall. 2010. The vowel phonologies of white and African American New York Residents. In Malcah Yaeger-Dror and *Erik R. Thomas (eds.)  African American English Speakers And Their Participation In Local Sound Changes: A Comparative Study. American Speech Volume Supplement 94, Number 1. Chapel Hill, NC: Duke University Press. pp: 101–128
 Becker, Kara & Elizabeth L. Coggshall. 2009. The Sociolinguistics of Ethnicity in New York City, 2009, Language and Linguistic Compass, 3(3): 751–766.4
 
 Becker, Kara. 2010. Regional Dialect Features on the Lower East Side of New York City: Sociophonetics, Ethnicity, and Identity. Unpublished Doctoral Dissertation, NYU.
 Bonfiglio, Thomas Paul. 2002. Race and the Rise of Standard American. New York: Mouton de Gruyter. 214–225.
 
 Cutler, Cece. 2007. Hip-hop language in sociolinguistics and beyond. Language and Linguistics Compass, 1(5):519–538.
 Cutler, Cece. 2008 Brooklyn Style: hip-hop markers and racial affiliation among European immigrants. International Journal of Bilingualism, 12(1–2), 7–24.
 
 Hubell, Allan F. 1972. The Pronunciation of English in New York City. NY: Farrar, Straus, and Giroux.
 Kurath, Hans and Raven I. McDavid. 1961. The Pronunciation of English in the Atlantic States. Ann Arbor: University of Michigan Press.
 Labov, William, Paul Cohen, Clarence Robins, and John Lewis. 1968. A study of the Non-Standard English of Negro and Puerto Rican Speakers in New York City, V. 1: Phonological and Grammatical Analysis. Washington, DC: Office of Education, Bureau of Research/ERIC.
 Labov, William, Paul Cohen, Clarence Robins, and John Lewis. 1968. A study of the Non-Standard English of Negro and Puerto Rican Speakers in New York City', V. 2: The Use of Language in the Speech Community. Washington, DC: Office of Education, Bureau of Research/ERIC.
 
 Labov, William. 1972a. Language in the Inner City:  Studies in the Black English Vernacular. Philadelphia, PA: University of Pennsylvania Press.
 Labov, William. 1972b. Sociolinguistic Patterns. Philadelphia, PA: University of Pennsylvania Press.
 Labov, William (1994) Principles of Linguistic Change: Volume 1: Internal Factors Blackwell 
 Labov, William (2001) Principles of Linguistic Change: Volume 2: Social Factors Blackwell 
 
 
 Labov, William (2007) "Transmission and Diffusion", Language June 2007
 Newman, Michael (2005). "New York Talk" in American Voices Walt Wolfram and Ben Ward (eds.). p. 82–87. Blackwell. .
 
 Schneider, E. W., Kortmann, B. (2005), A Handbook of Varieties of English: A Multi-Media Reference Tool, Mouton de Gruyter, p. 284
 
 
 
 
 Wells, J. C. 1982. Accents of English. 3 vols. Cambridge: Cambridge University Press.
 Wolfram, Walt. 1974. Sociolinguistic Aspects of Assimilation: Puerto Rican English in New York City. Washington, DC: Center for Applied Linguistics.
 Wolfram, Walt & Natalie Schilling Estes (2006) American English 2nd edition  Blackwell 
 Wolfram, Walt & Ward, Ben (2005) American Voices: How Dialects Differ from Coast to Coast Blackwell

External links
 Varieties of English: New York City phonology  from the University of Arizona's Language Samples Project
 A paper by Labov on dialect diversity, including information on NY dialect phonology
 The New York Latino English Project The site of the New York Latino English project, which studies the native English spoken by New York Latinos.
 A site with samples of speech in various dialects, including New York
 AM New York's feature on the New York accent
  Demonstration of NYC English raised and tensed /ɔ/, i.e., the THOUGHT vowel in words like 'coffee' and 'sausage.'

American English
City colloquials
English
Languages of New York (state)
Languages of New Jersey
Working-class culture in New York City